Mihrişah may refer to:

 Mihrişah Kadin (mother of Mustafa III) (d. 1732), consort of Ottoman Sultan Ahmed III, and the mother of Mustafa III
 Mihrişah Sultan (mother of Selim III) (1745-1805), consort of Ottoman Sultan Mustafa III, and the mother and valide sultan of Ottoman Sultan Selim III
 Mihrişah Sultan (daughter of Şehzade Izzeddin) (1916-1987), Ottoman princess, daughter of Şehzade Yusuf Izzeddin and granddaughter of Sultan Abdülaziz